Nivas K. Prasanna is an Indian music director and singer who works in Tamil film industry.

Career
Born and brought up in the Tirunelveli town of India in South Tamil Nadu, Nivas began learning Carnatic music aged ten and completed all seven grades of the piano when studying at Magdalene Matriculation Higher Secondary School in the town. He then moved to Chennai with his family and enrolled on the Visual Communications course at SRM Institute of Science and Technology and actively began seeking opportunities in the film music industry. Nivas was chosen by Rajesh Vaidhya to accompany him on tours as a keyboard player and the opportunity gave him the chance to network with other young professionals and work on the music for short films. He also worked with singer Saindhavi on creating a musical album titled Kannamma about the teachings of Bharathiyar, which impressed producer Santhosh from Think Music. Santhosh then recommended him to score the music for Pizza II: Villa (2013), but Nivas was eventually not selected. Santhosh later offered Nivas to work on the murder mystery film, Thegidi (2014), directed by Ramesh and the venture became Nivas's first project.

Thegidi won positive reviews for its music, and the film's success at the box office meant that Nivas K. Prasanna received attention for his work. For the album he worked alongside singers including Shankar Mahadevan, Andrea Jeremiah and Abhay Jodhpurkar. It also won him the Behindwoods Gold Award for Find of the Year, and the composer performed at the awards ceremony. His second album, Sethupathi (2016), received mixed reviews with a review from The Hindu stating it was a "cop-out". Its reported that Nivas has been signed to score the music for Kumki-2, sequel of Kumki and this is the first time that director Prabhu Soloman is working with a different music director, as his all previous movies were scored by D. Imman. Prabhu Solomon in his debut directorial worked with Composer Deva, in his second venture, a Kannada film USIRE with Maestro Ilayaraja and in his second and third Tamil films, King starring Vikram and Sneha and Kokki starring Karan had music by composer Dhina. Thereafter all his films music were composed by D.Imman till Kaadan which had Music by Shantanu Moitra.

Discography

Released soundtracks
 The year next to the title of the affected films indicates the release year of the either dubbed or remade version in the named language later than the original version.
 • indicates original language release. Indicates simultaneous makes, if featuring in more languages
 ♦ indicates a remade version, the remaining ones being dubbed versions

Forthcoming soundtracks

Playback singer

References

Living people
Musicians from Chennai
Tamil film score composers
Indian male film score composers
Year of birth missing (living people)
People from Tirunelveli